The Tarrytown Reservoir is an  storage reservoir in Tarrytown, New York. It was completed in 1897 by the Village of Tarrytown as the village's main storage reservoir. The reservoir was formed by the Tarrytown Waterworks Dam which impounded a tributary of the Saw Mill River.

The reservoir was decommissioned in 1993.

See also
List of reservoirs and dams in New York

References

Tarrytown, New York
Reservoirs in Westchester County, New York
Reservoirs in New York (state)
Protected areas of Westchester County, New York
1897 establishments in New York (state)